John Paskievich (born 1947) is a Canadian documentary photographer and filmmaker from Winnipeg, Manitoba.

Born to Ukrainian parents in a displaced persons camp in Austria after World War II, Paskievich immigrated to Canada as a child with his family.

He graduated from the University of Winnipeg and studied photography and film at Ryerson Polytechnic (now Toronto Metropolitan University). 

His photographs have been exhibited widely and are in the collections of many institutions including the National Gallery of Canada, the Winnipeg Art Gallery, the Ukrainian Canadian Cultural and Educational Centre (Winnipeg), the Banff Centre and the Art Gallery of Ontario. 

Paskievich’s photographic work has been published in several books: A Place Not Our Own (Queenston House 1977), Waiting for the Ice Cream Man… A Prison Journal (Converse 1978), Urban Indians (Hurtig 1980), A Voiceless Song (Lester & Orpen Denys 1983), The North End (University of Manitoba Press 2007), and The North End Revisited (University of Manitoba Press 2017). 

He has produced and directed numerous award winning documentary films including Ted Baryluk's Grocery (1982) The Actor (1990), If Only I Were an Indian (1996), The Gypsies of Svinia (1998), Unspeakable (2006) and The Storytelling Class.

References

External links

1947 births
Artists from Winnipeg
Canadian documentary film directors
Toronto Metropolitan University alumni
University of Winnipeg alumni
Living people
Canadian people of Ukrainian descent
Film directors from Winnipeg
Canadian photographers
Canadian Screen Award winners
National Film Board of Canada people